KGNC (710 kHz) is an AM radio broadcast station in Amarillo, Texas, United States with a news/talk format. The station is owned by Alpha Media LLC. Studios for KGNC and its partners are located in southwest Amarillo near the former Western Plaza shopping center. KGNC's programming is also broadcast on 97.5 FM by translator K248DE in Amarillo.

KGNC's transmitter site is located north of Amarillo in an unincorporated section of Potter County, and northeast of Amarillo in Carson County. KGNC operates fulltime with 10,000 watts, using different daytime and nighttime directional antennas. The station has a relatively large coverage area, due to its fairly high power and the surrounding area's good ground conductivity. The signal provides at least secondary coverage of large portions of Texas, Oklahoma, Kansas and New Mexico, including such cities as Lubbock and Abilene, Texas, Clovis and Roswell, New Mexico, and Garden City, Kansas. KGNC's signal has been received during the day in the suburbs of Dallas and Oklahoma City. At night, the station has a more restrictive directional antenna, that sends most of its signal north and south, and can sometimes be heard as far west as Tucson, Arizona. KGNC's transmitting frequency of 710 AM is a United States clear-channel frequency, on which WOR in New York City and KIRO in Seattle, Washington, share Class A status. Other stations, including KGNC, on this frequency must protect the nighttime skywave signals of the Class A stations, with reduced power and/or directional signals.

KGNC is one of the stations responsible for the activation of the Emergency Alert System in the Amarillo area.

Programming 

KGNC Newstalk 710 broadcasts ABC News on the hour, along with local news and weather updates (except during sporting events). The station broadcasts news and syndicated talk show programs such as The Kim Komando Show.  

 Weekdays: Local news updates are broadcast at 4 minutes past the hour. Weekday programs include NewsDay Amarillo, The Chat with David Lovejoy, Lori Crofford, Chuck Williams simulcast TV broadcast on Newschannel 10 from 7am to 9am Brian Kilmeade & Friends, Markley, Van Camp and Robbins, and The Dave Ramsey Show Saturdays: Local news updates are broadcast at 4 minutes past the hour until 5:04 PM. Regular programs include Coast to Coast AM with George Noory, The Golden Spread Agri-Business Hour, NewsDay Amarillo, Southwest Outdoors with Mel Phillips, Smart Money Radio with Mark and Marcy McKay, The Panhandle Greenhouse Garden Show, Dale Buckner's Financial Clinic, Let Me Speak To The Realtor with Greg Glenn, and The Dave Ramsey Show.
Sundays: Regular programs include Coast to Coast AM with Ian Punnett, The Horse Show, The Cowboy Corner, The Kim Komando Show, The Dave Ramsey Show, Coast to Coast AM'' with George Noory, and select paid programming.
Sporting events: Texas Rangers baseball and Dallas Cowboys football games. Programming resumes as scheduled after the conclusion of the sporting event.

History 

KGNC was formed in 1935, when the Amarillo Globe-News Publishing Company purchased and consolidated two existing stations, WDAG and KGRS.

Effective December 1, 1921, the Commerce Department, which regulated radio at this time, adopted regulations formally defining "broadcasting stations". The wavelength of 360 meters (833 kHz) was designated for entertainment broadcasts, while 485 meters (619 kHz) was reserved for broadcasting official weather and other government reports. Because there was only one available "entertainment" wavelength, stations in a given region had to develop timesharing agreements, in order to assign exclusive timeslots for broadcasting on 360 meters.  

Initially call letters beginning with "W" were generally assigned to stations east of an irregular line formed by the western state borders from North Dakota south to Texas, with calls beginning with "K" going only to stations in states west of that line. In January 1923 the Mississippi River was established as the new boundary, thus after this date Texas stations generally received call letters starting with "K" instead of "W".

WDAG
Amarillo's first broadcasting station was WDAG, licensed to J. Laurance Martin at 605 East Fourth Street on May 16, 1922 for operation on 360 meters. The call letters were randomly assigned from a sequential roster of available call signs.

In the late summer of 1230, WDAG was reassigned to 1140 kHz. In 1930, the owner became the National Radio and Broadcasting Company.

WQAC/KGRS
WQAC was first licensed to E. B. Gish on December 28, 1922, for operation on 360 meters. Gish owned the Gish Radio Service at 108 East Eighth Street in Amarillo. Like WDAG, the WQAC call letters were randomly assigned, and came from the same sequential roster of available call letters.

WQAC moved to 1280 kHz in early 1924. The station was reported deleted in late 1925, but then quickly relicensed, still on 1280 kHz. In late 1926 the call letters were changed from WQAC to KGRS, with the new call sign based on the initials of Gish Radio Service. On June 15, 1927 KGRS was assigned to 1230 kHz.

Consolidation of WDAG and KGRS as KGNC

Effective November 11, 1928, with the implementation of the Federal Radio Commission's General Order 40, both WDAG and KGRS were moved to  1410 kHz, on a timesharing basis.

As of 1935, WDAG and KGRS were still the only radio stations located in Amarillo. At this time the Globe-News Company, Inc., a local newspaper publisher, formed the Plains Radio Broadcasting Company in order to take over and consolidate the two stations. The licenses of both WDAG and KGRS were acquired and assigned to Plains Radio Broadcasting. KGRS was treated as the dominant station of the merger, and its call sign was changed to KGNC. Starting on June 1, 1935 the combined operation began broadcasting fulltime under the KGNC call letters. After Federal Communications Commission (FCC) approval of the merger, KGNC operated with 2,500 watts daytime, and 1,000 watts at night.

Later history

On March 29, 1941, stations on 1410 kHz, including KGNC, were moved to 1440 kHz, as part of the implementation of the North American Regional Broadcasting Agreement.

In 1947 KGNC moved to its current frequency assignment of 710 kHz. Another Amarillo station, KFDA, took advantage of the vacated frequency to move from 1230 to 1440 kHz.

In 1953 television station KGNC-TV began operations. An FM station, the first in the Texas panhandle, went on the air in November 1947, but suspended operations in 1950. In December 1958 a second affiliated FM station, which like the first had the call sign KGNC-FM, began broadcasting.

In 1994, the Federal Communications Commission found the Equal Employment Opportunity policies of KGNC and KGNC-FM to be deficient. The stations were notified of a fine of an apparent liability of $25,000, and given shorter than usual license renewals.

Translator

References

External links

KGNC website

FCC History Cards for KGNC (covering 1927-1980 as KGRS/KGNC)

GNC
News and talk radio stations in the United States
Radio stations established in 1922
1922 establishments in Texas
Alpha Media radio stations
Radio stations licensed before 1923 and still broadcasting